Fernando Teixeira dos Santos (born in Maia, September 13, 1951), GOIH is a Portuguese economist and professor. He was Minister of Finance in the Portuguese Government led by José Sócrates (XVII Governo Constitucional).

Career
Teixeira dos Santos has a degree in Economics by the University of Porto (1973), and a PhD in Economics by the University of South Carolina (1985). He embraced an academic career as university professor in the Faculdade de Economia da Universidade do Porto (FEP) (Economics School of the University of Porto).

He presided over the stock exchange authority of Portugal, the Comissão do Mercado de Valores Mobiliários (CMVM), until he received an invitation to enter the Portuguese government led by José Sócrates. He had been also the Secretary of State in the socialist governments of Prime Minister António Guterres. After had been Minister of Finances in the José Sócrates' cabinet, in 2011 he returned to his duties at the University of Porto's FEP.

Minister
In July 2005, Prime Minister José Sócrates made a request to President of the Republic Jorge Sampaio for the resignation of the Minister of Finance, Luís Campos e Cunha, for reasons of a personal nature, family and fatigue, according to an official source. This same source also added that the Prime Minister, Jose Sócrates, "at the same time" proposed the nomination of Fernando Teixeira Dos Santos as minister of Finances to the President of the Republic, Jorge Sampaio. Minister of Finances Teixeira dos Santos was pivotal as the highest-ranked officer of the country, involved in the management of all the issues related to the Portuguese sovereign debt crisis. As the months went on the Portuguese debt crisis got worse, an International Monetary Fund rescue plan was put in place, and the Sócrates' cabinet was dissolved. The Socialists were ousted from the Portuguese Government after the 2011 Portuguese legislative election and Teixeira dos Santos returned to his academic career at the University of Porto.

Duties in the Government of Portugal
Since 2009-10-26 to 2011-06-20:
Minister of Finance in the XVIII Governo Constitucional

Since 2005-07-21 to 2009-10-25:
Minister of Finance in the XVII Governo Constitucional

Since 2005-07-21 to 2009-10-25:
Minister of State in the XVII Governo Constitucional

Since 1995-10-30 to 1999-10-25:
State Secretary of Treasury and Finance in the XIII Governo Constitucional

Other activities
 African Development Bank (AfDB), Ex-Officio Member of the Board of Governors (2005-2011)
 Asian Development Bank (ADB), Ex-Officio Member of the Board of Governors (2005-2011)
 European Bank for Reconstruction and Development (EBRD), Ex-Officio Member of the Board of Governors (2005-2011)
 European Investment Bank (EIB), Ex-Officio Member of the Board of Governors (2005-2011)

Recognition
  Grand Officer of the Order of Prince Henry, Portugal (28 June 2005)
 Grand-Cross of the Order of Christ, Portugal (9 June 2015)

Personal life
Teixeira dos Santos is married to Maria Clementina Pereira Nunes with whom he had two children.

Notes
The title Minister of State is attributed to ministers that have a role similar to deputy Prime Minister.

References

External links
Biography on Portugal.gov.pt

1951 births
Living people
People from Maia, Portugal
20th-century Portuguese economists
Government ministers of Portugal
Socialist Party (Portugal) politicians
Finance ministers of Portugal
University of Porto alumni
21st-century Portuguese economists
Academic staff of the University of Porto